Margiza is a monotypic moth genus of the family Erebidae. Its only species, Margiza purpuraria, is found in Colombia. Both the genus and the species were first described by Paul Dognin in 1914.

References

Herminiinae